The 22nd Army Corps (-в/ч 73954) is a corps of the coastal defence troops of the Black Sea Fleet of the Russian Navy. Formed in 2017 after the annexation of Crimea by the Russian Federation, the corps is headquartered in Simferopol and controls units based in Crimea.

In February and March 2022 the corps played a leading role in the invasion of Ukraine, operating in Southern Ukraine.

History 
The 22nd Army Corps was formed on 1 December 2016, after the annexation of the Crimea by Russia. The corps includes units of the coastal troops of the Black Sea Fleet, and is ultimately part of the Southern Military District.

The 126th Coastal Defence Brigade had been activated from a previous Ukrainian formation in December 2014 and joined the corps.

In December 2018, the corps was presented with colours after distinguishing itself on combat missions.

As of 2021, formations and units of the corps included:

 22nd Army Corps, HQ in Simferopol
 127th Reconnaissance Brigade (status unclear as of January 2022)
 126th Gorlovskaya Guards Coastal Defence Brigade, Perevalnoe. Reported equipped as mechanized infantry brigade, including T-72B3 main battle tanks.
 8th Artillery Regiment
 Surface-to-surface missile battalion (9K720 Iskander) reportedly to be added in 2022
 1096th Anti-Aircraft Missile Regiment
 4th CBRN Protection Regiment

General Major Denis Lyamin was reported as the corps commander in June 2021. From February 2022 Lyamin was one of the commanders of the invasion of Ukraine from Crimea; he was declared a war criminal by Ukraine.

General Major Arkady Marzoev was reported as taking over command of the corps in November 2021.

Ammunition depots of the 22nd Army Corps were struck on 14 May 2022 in the 2022 Chornobaivka attacks during the Russian invasion of Ukraine. Ukrainian Ministry of Defence sources said as of 23 April 2022, "in connection with the unsatisfactory fulfillment of the assigned tasks, the commander of the 22nd Army Corps, Major General Arkady Marzoev, was removed from his post." In early July 2022, reportedly the chief of staff Major General Nasbulin was killed in Ukraine.

Assignments 
 2017–present; Southern Military District — Coastal Defence Troops

Commanders 
 Lieutenant General Andrei Vladimirovich Kolotovkin (February 2017 – December 2018)
 Lieutenant General Konstantin Georgievich Kastornov (December 2018 – November 2020)
 Major General Denis Igorevich Lyamin (November 2020 – November 2021)
 Major General Arkady Marzoev (November 2021 – April 2022)
 Major General Artem Nasbulin (April 2022 – )

Footnotes 

Military units and formations established in 2017
2017 establishments in Russia
Army corps of the Russian Federation